Eric William Mann (4 March 1882 – 11 February 1954) was an English cricketer and philatelist who signed the Roll of Distinguished Philatelists in 1947. He was President of the Royal Philatelic Society London between 1946 and 1949. Mann was an expert on the stamps of Natal and Tasmania.

Early life
Mann was born at Sidcup in Kent and educated at Harrow School and Trinity College, Cambridge. He played both cricket and football at school, captaining the cricket team in 1901 and the football side in 1899 and 1900. He captained the cricket team to victory in the Eton v Harrow match at Lord's in 1901, scoring 69 runs in an innings which was described as "fine and attractive".

Cricket
At school Mann was described as "a good player and a good captain" and at University he played for the Cambridge University side from 1902 to 1905, captaining it in his final season. He won his first cricket Blue in 1903 and played in three University matches from 1903 to 1905. His form as a batsman was generally steady and it was not until his final season at Cambridge that he stood out, topping the Cambridge batting averages with 758 runs at an average of 46.05 runs per innings, including scoring both of his first-class centuries. He captained the side to victory in the university match, although he made scores of 14 and 0 in the match.

His Wisden obituary described Mann as "a hard-hitting batsman with free style and special strength on the leg-side" and as "a useful change bowler", although he played little first-class cricket after leaving university, at least in part due to business commitments. He played in six matches for Kent County Cricket Club whilst at university but had "little success" and averaged only 7.50 runs for the county side.

In 1905 Mann captained an MCC side which toured North America, playing in both first-class matches against the Gentlemen of Philadelphia, the last of his career. He continued to play club cricket when time allowed, playing for a variety of teams including Band of Brothers, Sidmouth and MCC.

Business and later life
After leaving university, Mann joined the family business EW Mann & Co, a coal distribution and marketing business which operated across southern England. He married Kitzie Cameron, the daughter of Ewen Cameron, chairman of the Hong Kong and Shanghai Bank, in 1906; the couple had five children, one of whom died on active service during World War II.

Mann was in business throughout his life. He was a director of a range of companies, including pharmaceutical manufacturer's Southall's, British Safety Films, Belmont Hotels and Mann, Taylor & Co and was chairman of the British East Africa Corporation. He was president of the Royal Philatelic Society between 1946 and 1949 and hunted with the Royal Berkshire Hunt.

Mann died at Rye in Sussex in 1954 aged 71.

References

Signatories to the Roll of Distinguished Philatelists
British philatelists
Presidents of the Royal Philatelic Society London
People educated at Harrow School
Alumni of Trinity College, Cambridge
English cricketers
Kent cricketers
Marylebone Cricket Club cricketers
Cambridge University cricketers
1882 births
1954 deaths